Canadian Home & Country magazine was launched in the 1980s to offer decorating and style advice traditional Canadian homes.  The magazine was relaunched in 2000 as Canada's magazine about country homes and style.  Article topics include home décor, recipes, antiques and collectibles, and style advice. One of the editors was Cobi Ladner. The final editor was Erin McLaughlin.

Published eight times a year, Canadian Home & Country magazine was owned by Transcontinental Media, which bought original publisher Avid Media in 2004. The magazine also organized the Canadian Home & Country Show every October. Transcontinental closed Canadian Home & Country in 2009.

References

External links
Magazine website

Defunct magazines published in Canada
Eight times annually magazines
Lifestyle magazines published in Canada
Magazines established in 1987
Magazines disestablished in 2009
Magazines published in Toronto